Aleksandar Aleksandrov (born 15 February 1944) is a Bulgarian volleyball player. He competed in the men's tournament at the 1968 Summer Olympics.

References

1944 births
Living people
Bulgarian men's volleyball players
Olympic volleyball players of Bulgaria
Volleyball players at the 1968 Summer Olympics
People from Lukovit